Darius Knight is a male international table tennis player from England.

Table tennis career
He represented England at two World Table Tennis Championships in the Swaythling Cup (men's team event) from 2006-2008.

He has won seven English National Table Tennis Championships titles (four in the singles and three in the mixed doubles).

See also
 List of England players at the World Team Table Tennis Championships

References

English male table tennis players
1990 births
Living people
Commonwealth Games medallists in table tennis
Commonwealth Games silver medallists for England
Table tennis players at the 2010 Commonwealth Games
Medallists at the 2010 Commonwealth Games